United States gubernatorial elections were held in 1903, in eight states.

Kentucky, Louisiana, Maryland and Mississippi held their gubernatorial elections in odd numbered years, every 4 years, preceding the United States presidential election year. Massachusetts and Rhode Island both elected its governors to a single-year term, which they would abandon in 1920 and 1912, respectively. Ohio at this time held gubernatorial elections in every odd numbered year.

In Iowa, following a 1904 amendment to the constitution moving the election schedule, the governor's term was lengthened to three years. Elections would be held in even-numbered years from the 1906 elections.

Results

References